Bialik was originally a Polish/Czech surname before it was adopted by the Ashkenazi Jewish population. The name probably originated from the Polish word Biały (meaning white) used a nickname for a blond or unusually pale person. People with this name include:

 Carl Bialik, journalist
 Hayim Nahman Bialik (1873–1934), Israel's national poet
 Mayim Bialik (born 1975), actress

See also
There are several things named after Hayim Bialik 
 Bialik College
 Bialik Hebrew Day School
 Bialik High School
 Bialik House
 Bialik Prize
 Kiryat Bialik
 Kfar Bialik

References

Ashkenazi surnames
Polish-language surnames
Yiddish Polonisms